"Kiss Them for Me" is a song written and recorded by English rock band Siouxsie and the Banshees. It was produced by Stephen Hague. It was released in 1991 as the first single from the band's 10th studio album, Superstition.

Upon its release, the single received enthusiastic reviews. "Kiss Them for Me" became their most successful single in the US.

Background and lyrics
The song presented a change in musical direction for Siouxsie and the Banshees, adopting a much more straightforward pop-oriented feel than previous efforts, due in part to Hague's production work. Siouxsie Sioux's cryptic lyrics were an ode to actress and sex symbol Jayne Mansfield. The lyrics use Mansfield's catchword "divoon", referring to her heart-shaped swimming pool and her love of champagne and parties, and to the car crash that killed her in 1967. Kiss Them for Me was also the name of a 20th Century Fox motion picture made in 1957 starring Mansfield and Cary Grant.

Composition
A mid-tempo dance-pop track, it was influenced by Asian music and featured South Asian instrumentation, which had become popular in the UK club scene due to the growth of bhangra. Tabla player Talvin Singh (future percussionist for Björk on her 1993 Debut album) took part in the sessions and also sang during the bridge. The beat was taken from a Roland TR-909 drum machine stock beat that had previously been used on Schoolly D's 1985 single "P.S.K. What Does It Mean?"

Reception
Melody Maker wrote a rave review, calling it "sublime", but noting that some listeners would be "horrified by its baggy backbeat and sheer unashamed danceability. It doesn't just groove, [...] It floats almost imperceptibly to its ecstatic climax, each sweet verse and saccharin chorus a tantalising hint of what's to come. And when it comes, by Christ your knees give way".

PopMatters retrospectively included it in their list of "The 20 Most Memorable Songs of 1991".

Release
"Kiss Them for Me" was released on 13 May 1991, and was Siouxsie and the Banshees' biggest hit in the United States. It became their second and last entry on the Billboard Hot 100 and their first single to hit the top 40, peaking at No. 23 in the week of 19 October. It also became the band's second chart-topper on the U.S. Modern Rock Tracks chart, spending five weeks at No. 1 during the summer of 1991. "Kiss Them for Me" was the first Banshees song to hit the top 10 on the US US Hot Dance/Disco chart, peaking at No. 8. It also spent several months on heavy rotation on MTV. In the UK, "Kiss Them for Me" peaked at No. 32 in the UK Singles Chart, the band's 16th top 40 single.

The "Snapper Mix" includes a spoken sample of Jayne Mansfield from the movie Will Success Spoil Rock Hunter?, while the "Kathak Mix", remixed by producer Youth, features spoken samples of Robert Anton Wilson in the introduction.

In the UK, two different 12-inch records were released. The first included the "Snapper Mix" of "Kiss Them for Me" with the non-album B-sides "Staring Back" and "Return". The second version contained three different versions of "Kiss Them for Me" by Youth: the "Kathak Mix" on the A-side and the "Loveappella Mix" and "Ambient Mix" on the B-side.

Cover versions and legacy
The song was covered by Diane Birch, School of Seven Bells in 2010 and Anna Nalick in 2011. It was occasionally used as background music on the CBC Radio One program Q and was used in the Daria episode "Ill". "Kiss Them for Me" was the last song played on the MTV program 120 Minutes.

Track listing
US CD maxi single (GEFDS-21650) on Geffen Records
 "Kiss Them for Me (7" Version)" – 4:29
 "Staring Back" – 3:16
 "Return" – 5:02
 "Kiss Them for Me (Kathak Mix)" – 8:56

Tracks 2 and 3 were produced by Siouxsie and the Banshees and engineered by Charles Gray

Charts

Weekly charts

Year-end charts

See also 

 Number one modern rock hits of 1991

References 

Songs about kissing
1991 singles
Siouxsie and the Banshees songs
Song recordings produced by Stephen Hague
1991 songs
Songs written by Siouxsie Sioux
Songs written by Budgie (musician)
Songs written by Steven Severin
Songs written by Martin McCarrick